The J. Anthony Lukas Book Prize is an annual award in the amount of $10,000 given to a book that exemplifies, "literary grace, a commitment to serious research and social concern.” The prize is given by the Nieman Foundation and by the Columbia University School of Journalism.

Established in 1998, the Lukas Prize Project consists of three awards:
 The J. Anthony Lukas Book Prize ($10,000)
 The Mark Lynton History Prize ($10,000)
 The J. Anthony Lukas Work-in-Progress Award ($25,000 plus $5,000 for an annual finalist)
The project is named for Pulitzer Prize-winning American journalist and author, J. Anthony Lukas; it has been underwritten since its inception by the family of Mark Lynton, a German Jew who had careers with the British military, Citroen and Hunter Douglas.

Winners and Shortlisted Authors
In the list below, winners are listed first in the gold row, followed by the other nominees. Any finalists are marked with an asterisk. Note that shortlists were announced only starting in 2016; previously they would just announce winners and any finalists.

See also

 Mark Lynton History Prize 
 J. Anthony Lukas Work-in-Progress Award

References

External links
Past winners and jurors at Columbia School of Journalism

American non-fiction literary awards
Awards established in 1999
Awards and prizes of Columbia University
1999 establishments in New York (state)
Columbia University Graduate School of Journalism